Yossi & Jagger is a 2002 Israeli romantic drama film directed by Eytan Fox about soldiers at the Israel–Lebanon border who try to find some peace and solace from the daily routine of war.

The film has a sequel entitled Yossi ( Yossi's Story) released in 2012 that picks up the story a number of years after the events in the first film.

Plot
Yossi (Ohad Knoller) commands a company of soldiers in the snow-covered mountains near Lebanon. In secrecy, he leads a passionate romantic relationship with his second-in-command officer, Lior (Yehuda Levi), who is called Jagger by everyone for his rock star-like handsomeness and his lip-syncing Mick Jagger.
The pair, Yossi and Jagger, lead a loving, yet secret life together, venturing off to be alone and open with one another.
 
One day, a colonel (Sharon Raginiano) arrives at the base with two female soldiers, one of whom he immediately sleeps with in the bunker. The other one, Yaeli (Aya Koren, credited as Aya Steinovitz), is very interested in Jagger, while she refuses the sexual advances of Ofir (Asi Cohen), who tries to make clear to her that Jagger is not particularly interested in her.

The colonel is there to supervise a night-time ambush, of which Yossi is resentful because of the full moon, and also because he fears for his soldiers' safety. And indeed Jagger is fatally injured that night, dying in the arms of his lover, who only now is able to articulate his love for him.

At the funeral reception at Jagger's parents' house, Jagger's mother mistakes Yaeli for his girlfriend. She laments that she knew very little about her son, including his favorite song, which only Yossi is able to tell her was "Bo" sung by Rita.  The song was also sung by Ivri Lider.

Cast
 Ohad Knoller as Yossi
 Yehuda Levi as Lior Amichai 'Jagger'
 Assi Cohen as Ophir
 Aya Steinovitz as Yaeli
 Hani Furstenberg as Goldie
 Sharon Raginiano as The Colonel
 Yuval Semo as Psycho
 Yaniv Moyal as Samoncha
 Hanan Savyon as Adams
 Erez Kahana as Yaniv the Cook
 Shmulik Bernheimer as Shmuel 'Shmulik' Amichai
 Yael Pearl as Varda Amichai

Production
Although Yossi & Jagger originally didn't receive any support from the Israeli military during its production, its popularity proved high enough with Israeli citizens that military bases in the country began to show screenings later on.

Reception
The film received positive reviews from critics. Review aggregator Rotten Tomatoes reports that 88% out of 42 professional critics gave the film a positive review, with the site's consensus being "A tersely told yet deeply felt romance."  At Metacritic, which assigns a normalized rating out of 100 based on reviews from mainstream critics, the film received an average score of 70, based on 19 reviews. Stephen Holden from The New York Times "If the situation has all the ingredients of a shrill, tearful melodrama, the filmmaker, working from a taut screenplay by Avner Bernheimer that doesn’t waste a word or a gesture, keeps the emotional lid firmly in place." Ella Taylor from L.A. Weekly wrote "Enlivened by journalist Avner Bernheimer’s delicately witty script and some lively ensemble performances under the direction of Eytan Fox, the film offers a haunting portrait of a generation forced to risk their lives in the service of military goals they’re far from totally committed to." Wesley Morris from the Boston Globe wrote "What the movie lacks in ambition, originality, and grit, it makes up for in pure feeling."

Actor Ohad Knoller won the award for best actor at the 2003 Tribeca Film Festival, for his portrayal of Yossi.

The film did not receive production assistance from the Israeli army but proved to be popular in Israel and was later shown on military bases.

See also
 List of lesbian, gay, bisexual or transgender-related films

References

External links
 
 

2002 films
2000s Hebrew-language films
Israeli LGBT-related films
LGBT-related coming-of-age films
Films about the Israel Defense Forces
2002 romantic drama films
2000s war drama films
LGBT-related romantic drama films
2002 LGBT-related films
Films about LGBT and Judaism
Gay-related films
Israeli drama films
Films directed by Eytan Fox